Terra Alta, Pará is a municipality in the state of Pará in the Northern region of Brazil. As of 2020, the municipality had a population of 11,847.

See also
List of municipalities in Pará

References

Municipalities in Pará